AS Banque de l'Habitat is a football club based in Tunis, Tunisia and owned by the BH Bank (Tunisia) formerly formerly Banque de l'habitat. The club is playing in the Tunisian Women's Championship, the top division in the Tunisia female football league system. They have won the championship on three occasions.

In July 2021, the club took part in the inaugural 2021 CAF Women's Champions League UNAF Qualifiers which was won by AS FAR.

Current squad

Honours

Domestic 
League titles

 Tunisian Women's Championship

 Winners  (4): 2010, 2018, 2019, 2022

 Runners Up  (3): 2008, 2017, 2021

 Tunisian Women's Cup

 Winners  (1): 2010

 Runners Up  (3): 2008, 2011, 2013

Tunisian Women's League Cup (Coupe de la Ligue Féminine)

 Winners  (2): 2015, 2019

Performance in CAF competitions 

 CAF Women's Champions League: 1 appearance

 2021 – UNAF qualifiers round
 2022 – UNAF qualifiers round

References 

 
Football clubs in Tunis
Football clubs in Tunisia
Women's football clubs in Tunisia